Open Net is a non-governmental organization which aims for the freedom and openness of South Korea's internet. It was approved by Seoul Radiowave Management Office on 7 March 2013.

Activities 

Open Net works on major projects grouped under the banners such as "Freedom of Speech", "Intellectual Property", "Privacy", "Network neutrality", "Open Government", and "Innovation and Regulations".

On July 31, 2013, Open Net submitted a Constitutional complaint about how the South Korean government forces minors to verify his or her identity.
In August 2013, Open Net and Aladdin Communications started a non-Active X payment system, however, card companies refused to accept. Open Net submitted a preliminary injunction to accept it.
On January 28, 2014, OpenNet filed a lawsuit against the Korea Communications Standards Commission's internet censorship by blocking access to Grooveshark. On 17 January 2014, OpenNet accepts donations via Bitcoin. OpenNet is the first Korean NGO who accepts Bitcoin donation.

See also 

 Internet censorship in South Korea

References

External links 
   - basis of Open Net, OpenWeb.
   - basis of Open Net, Internet Law Clinic of Korea University Law School.

Internet censorship in South Korea